The 2019 International GT Open was the fourteenth season of the International GT Open, the grand tourer-style sports car racing series founded in 2006 by the Spanish GT Sport Organización. It began on 27 April at Le Castellet and will finish on 12 October, at Monza after seven double-header meetings.

Entry List

Race calendar and results
 A seven-round provisional calendar was revealed on 22 September 2018. The schedule will feature six circuits from 2018 calendar, while Estoril will be dropped in favor of Hockenheimring. The date of the Spa round was altered on 29 November 2018. On 1 February 2019, Hungaroring were replaced by Red Bull Ring, and 2019 International GT Open Round 4 moved to 13–14 July.

Championship standings

Points systems 

Points are awarded to the top 10 (Pro) or top 6 (Am, Pro-Am, Teams) classified finishers. If less than 6 participants start the race or if less than 75% of the original race distance is completed, half points are awarded. At the end of the season, the lowest race score is dropped; however, the dropped race cannot be the result of a disqualification or race ban.

Overall

Pro-Am, Am, and Teams

Drivers' championships

Overall

Pro-Am

Am

Teams' Championship 
Only the highest two finishing cars from a team count towards the Teams' Championship

Notes

References

External links
 

International GT Open
International GT Open seasons